Cataclysta amboinalis is a moth in the family Crambidae. It was described by Hubert Marion in 1917. It is found on Ambon Island.

References

Acentropinae
Moths described in 1917